Paulinus Mayhew Foster (1811-1861) was an American lawyer and politician from Maine. Foster, a Democrat, served two single year terms in the Maine Senate in 1849 and 1850. In his second year, Foster was elected Senate President by his peers.

Foster was born in Readfield, Maine and spent 25 years in Anson, Maine. He retired to Richmond, Maine in 1860 and died a year later.

References

1811 births
1861 deaths
People from Readfield, Maine
People from Anson, Maine
Maine lawyers
Presidents of the Maine Senate
Democratic Party Maine state senators
19th-century American politicians
People from Richmond, Maine
19th-century American lawyers